Ricky Tulengi (born 2 February 1993) is a Congolese professional footballer who plays as a midfielder.

External links 
 

1993 births
Living people
Democratic Republic of the Congo footballers
Democratic Republic of the Congo international footballers
Association football midfielders
Democratic Republic of the Congo A' international footballers
2016 African Nations Championship players
Difaâ Hassani El Jadidi players
AS Vita Club players
Democratic Republic of the Congo expatriate footballers
Democratic Republic of the Congo expatriate sportspeople in Morocco
Expatriate footballers in Morocco
2020 African Nations Championship players